Birdsall is a village and civil parish in the Ryedale district of North Yorkshire, England.  It was historically part of the East Riding of Yorkshire until 1974. According to the 2001 census it had a population of 180, increasing to 343 at the 2011 Census.  The village is about four miles south of Malton and the parish also includes the village of North Grimston.

Birdsall House

Birdsall House is the seat of Baron Middleton. Thomas Willoughby (1694–1742), brother of Francis Willoughby, 2nd Baron Middleton, married Elizabeth Sotheby of Birdsall, and their son Henry inherited the barony and Willoughby estates in Nottinghamshire and Warwickshire from his cousin in 1781.

Church of All Hallows and Cross
The ruins of the ancient church of All Hallows and Cross stand adjacent to Birdsall House. The present church of St Mary in Birdsall was built in 1824 at the expense of Henry Willoughby, 6th Baron Middleton.

References

External links

Villages in North Yorkshire
Civil parishes in North Yorkshire